Lupin III is a Japanese manga series, written and illustrated by Monkey Punch. It spawned a media franchise that includes several animated television series, television specials, theatrical and home video features as well as further manga titles.

The story follows the adventures of a gang of thieves led by Arsène Lupin III, the grandson of Arsène Lupin, the gentleman thief of Maurice Leblanc's series of novels. Lupin and his gang travel throughout the world to steal treasures and escape from the law.

Lupin III was written and illustrated by Monkey Punch. It was serialized by Futabasha in Weekly Manga Action in 94 chapters from August 10, 1967. Additional chapters known as Lupin III New Adventures were released from August 12, 1971. Tokyopop licensed the series for North America, and released all 14 volumes between December 10, 2002 and July 6, 2004. The Tokyopop edition is adapted from the Chuokoron Shinsha edition from 1989.

Original serialization

Tokyopop release

Japanese editions

Power Comics

100ten

Aizouban
The order of chapters in this edition is altered slightly, with some chapters not included and multipart stories having less chapters.

References

Chapters
Lupin III